Events in the year 1998 in Monaco.

Incumbents 
 Monarch: Rainier III
 State Minister: Michel Lévêque

Events 

 15 July – Camille Marie Kelly Gottlieb was born to Princess Stephanie of Monaco at Princess Grace Hospital Centre in La Colle, Monaco. Although she did not identify the father's name on the birth certificate, it was widely suspected, from the start, that Camille's father is Jean Raymond Gottlieb, and, indeed, Camille herself has acknowledged Gottlieb as her father. As her parents never married, Camille is not included in the line of succession to the Monegasque throne.
 24 May – 1998 Monaco Grand Prix was a 78-lap race that took place at Circuit de Monaco. The winner was  Mika Häkkinen.

Deaths

See also 

 1998 in Europe
 City states

References 

 
Years of the 20th century in Monaco
1990s in Monaco
Monaco
Monaco